The Csanyik Valley, or simply Csanyik, is a valley in Miskolc, near Lillafüred, Hungary. With an area of 105.801 m² it is the second largest green area of the city after Tapolca-Hejőliget.

The valley got its name after the mediaeval village of Csenik, which was first mentioned in documents in 1313, when Palatine István donated it to the Pauline monastery of Diósgyőr that he founded. The inhabitants of the village were mainly winegrowers. The village became extinct in the late 15th to early 16th century.

The Miskolc Zoo, opened in 1983, can be found in the Csanyik.

On summer holidays (e.g. on the holiday of the city, May 11) various events are held here.

Miskolc
Geography of Borsod-Abaúj-Zemplén County
Valleys of Europe